Dora Cecil Chapman (24 March 1911 – 15 May 1995), also known as Dora Cant, was a painter, silk-screen printer, potter and art teacher. A resident of South Australia, New South Wales, and England, she was concerned with changing society through social realist art.

Biography 
Chapman was born at Mount Barker, South Australia on 24 March 1911. She won a scholarship to the South Australian School of Arts and Crafts (1928–1932) and studied in 1936–41 under Marie Tuck, Dorrit Black, Leslie Wilkie, Louis McCubbin and Ivor Hele. She joined the United Arts Club where students could sketch from life.

Chapman was exhibiting from 1935 when she showed a group of paintings, with her still life images deemed most successful. As well as paintings, she exhibited hand-weaving and some well-modelled pottery which gave "further evidence of her artistic ability". From 1935 she exhibited with the Royal South Australian Society of Arts (RSASA) and was elected an associate member while still a student. In 1940 Chapman was awarded the RSASA's Alex Melrose Prize which was to "stimulate figurative painting". Judged by Louis McCubbin and Hans Heysen, Chapman won with a "hard but striking self-portrait". In 1941 she won the RSASA Portrait Prize. The following year she joined the army, achieved the rank of Sergeant, lecturing in education until 1945 as well as establishing a Fine Art Print Library and organising an art exhibition of work by army personnel.

After the war Chapman and the Sydney artist James Cant co-founded the Studio of Realist Art (SORA) in Sydney; she became its secretary, gave drawing lessons and established a library at SORA's premises and organised and participated in SORA exhibitions. During this time her subjects were mainly semi-abstract landscapes, still-lifes and occasional portraits. She and Cant married in 1945.

In 1950 they went to London and remained there for five years, also visiting France and Italy. They returned to Sydney, but a year later moved permanently to Adelaide. Chapman lectured at the SA School of Art from 1958 to 1969 and from time to time afterwards although officially retired. She was also an art critic for the Adelaide Advertiser during these years. In 1961 she was awarded the Melrose Prize for portraiture. She became interested in 1969 in representing aspects of human character, rather than individuals, and produced a series of silkscreens in the form of stylised, female portrait heads, some named after Australian native plants. After her retirement she began to produce serigraphs like The Girl With A Long Nose (1970, NGA) and Katinka (1973, p.c.), and silk-screen printing remained a major interest.

Dora Chapman died in Adelaide on 15 May 1995.

Political activism 
Dora was a member of the Australian Communist Party 1945.

Awards 

 John Creswell Scholarship, South Australian School of Arts and Craft, 1935 
 Alex Melrose Prize for figurative painting, RSASA, 1940
 John Christie Wright Prize, awarded three times early in her career
 Melrose Prize for Portraiture, 1961
 Royal South Australian Portrait Prize, 1941

References

External links 
 Dora Chapman interviewed by Hazel de Berg in the Hazel de Berg collection at the National Library of Australia
The Girl with a long nose II, 1970. National Gallery of Australia
 Aldinga, 1970. Art Gallery of NSW
 Sunflower, 1969, National Gallery of Australia
 Self-portrait, c 1940, Art Gallery of South Australia

Australian women artists
Australian artists
1911 births
1995 deaths